The Khaled Stakes is an American Thoroughbred horse race held annually at Hollywood Park Racetrack in Inglewood, California. Sponsored by the TVG Network, the race is contested on turf over a distance of one and one-eighth miles (nine furlongs). The event is restricted to horses age four years and older who were bred in State of California.

Part of the California Gold Rush Day program at Hollywood Park Racetrack, the Khaled Stakes is run as the male counterpart to the Fran's Valentine Stakes for mares.

Distances:
  miles : 1990–2002
  miles 2003–present

Historical notes

In winning his second Khaled Stakes in 2002, nine-year-old Native Desert joined John Henry as the oldest horse ever to win a stakes race at Hollywood Park.

Records
Speed  record: (at current distance of  miles)
 1:44.26 – Lava Man (2006)

Most wins:
 2 – Journalism (1994, 1995)
 2 – Native Desert (1998, 2002)
 2 – Spinelessjellyfish (2000, 2001)

Winners since 1998

Earlier winners
 1997 – Gastown
 1996 – no race
 1995 – Journalism
 1994 – Journalism
 1993 – Patriotaki
 1992 – Blaze O'Brien
 1991 – C Sam Maggio
 1990 – River Master

Notes

References
 A History of the Khalid Stakes at the CTBA
 The Hollywood Park 2009 California Gold Rush Day at ESPN
 Video at YouTube of the 2008 Khaled Stakes

Horse races in California
Hollywood Park Racetrack
Restricted stakes races in the United States
Flat horse races for four-year-olds
Open mile category horse races
Recurring events established in 1990